Staryi Merchyk is an urban-type settlement in Bohodukhiv Raion of Kharkiv Oblast in Ukraine. It is located on the Mokryi Merchyk, a tributary of the Merchyk in the drainage basin of the Dnieper. Staryi Merchyk belongs to Valky urban hromada, one of the hromadas of Ukraine. Population: 

Until 18 July 2020, Staryi Merchyk belonged to Valky Raion. The raion was abolished in July 2020 as part of the administrative reform of Ukraine, which reduced the number of raions of Kharkiv Oblast to seven. The area of Valky Raion was merged into Bohodukhiv Raion.

Economy

Transportation
The closest railway stations are Merchyk on the railway connecting Kharkiv with Sumy via Bohodukhiv and Ohultsi on the railway connecting Kharkiv with Poltava. Both stations have some passenger traffic.

The settlement has access to Highway M03 which connects Kharkiv with Kyiv.

References

Urban-type settlements in Bohodukhiv Raion
Valkovsky Uyezd